Sierra de Salamanca is a Spanish Denominación de Origen Protegida (DOP), traditionally called a Vino de calidad con Indicación Geográfica. This is one step below the mainstream Denominación de Origen quality wines and one step above the less stringent Vino de la Tierra wines on the quality ladder. It is located in the province of Salamanca (region of Castile and León), and known for its red wines using the native Rufete grape.

Authorised Grape Varieties
The authorised grape varieties are:

 Red: Rufete, Garnacha Tinta, and Tempranillo
 White: Viura, Moscatel de Grano Menudo, and Palomino

References

External links

 Sierra de Salamanca DOP official website

Wine regions of Spain
Spanish wine
Appellations
Wine classification